The following is a list of 2021 box office number-one films in France.

See also

 List of 2023 box office number-one films in France

References

2021
France
2021 in French cinema